Francisco Augusto Furtado (born 1917, date of death unknown), also known as Chiquito, was a Brazilian rower who competed in the 1952 Summer Olympics. Furtado is deceased.

References

1917 births
Year of death missing
Brazilian male rowers
Olympic rowers of Brazil
Rowers at the 1952 Summer Olympics